Poco-poco or Poco poco is a popular line dance from Maluku province in Indonesia.

The Poco-poco dance became popular in early 1998. In the beginning, the Poco-Poco dance was only an environment known for its emotional closeness with family, relatives, and relatives in Maluku. This dance is accompanied by a song from Maluku which is also titled poco-poco.  The poco-poco song was composed by a native Indonesian Ambon songwriter named Arie Sapulette and sung by a famous singer at the time named Yopie Latul. The Poco-Poco dance has found its place in the hearts of the Indonesian people.  Since its release, the song and/or accompanying dance has made its way into weddings, family gatherings, and other gatherings of Indonesian people.

See also

 Cakalele
 Dance in Indonesia

External links
 http://www.theminahasa.net/social/stories/pocopoco.html
Dances of Indonesia

Indonesian music
Dances of Indonesia
Indonesian culture